Vlasman Cycling Team is a Dutch cycling team founded in 2017. After competing domestically in their first year, the team gained UCI Continental status in 2018.

Team roster

References

External links

UCI Continental Teams (Europe)
Cycling teams based in the Netherlands
Cycling teams established in 2017